Club Feminine de carthage (often referred to as CFC) is a Tunisian Women's Volleyball Club that was founded since 2011 in Carthage, Tunis and Currently they Play in Tunisian Volleyball 1st Division.

Previous Names

 Club Femenine de Carthage (2011—Present)

Team Roster
2020—21

Technical and managerial staff

Honours

National Achievements
Tunisian Championship :
 Winners (9) : 2013, 2014, 2015, 2016, 2017, 2018, 2020, 2021, 2022
 Runners up (0) :

Tunisian Cup :
 Winners (6) : 2015, 2016, 2017, 2020, 2021, 2022
 Runners up (3) : 2012, 2014, 2018

Tunisian Super Cup :
 Winners (4) : 2017, 2020, 2021, 2022
 Runners up (2) : 2018, 2019

International Achievements
African Club Championship :
 Winners (2) : 2017, 2021
 Runners up (3) :  2016,  2018,  2019
 Third place (1) :  2015

Head coaches

As of 2017

Notable players

 Mariem Brik
 Fatma Agrebi
 Rahma Agrebi
 Fatma Ktari
 Maïssa Lengliz
 Khouloud Jenhani
 Abir Othmani

External links
 Official Page  in Facebook

References

Tunisian volleyball clubs
Volleyball clubs established in 2011
2011 establishments in Tunisia
Sport in Tunis